is a Japanese athlete specialising in the triple jump. He represented his country at the 2017 World Championships without qualifying for the final.

His personal bests in the event are 16.87 metres outdoors (+1.8 m/s, Hiroshima 2017) and 15.71 metres indoors (Osaka 2014).

International competitions

References

1995 births
Living people
Sportspeople from Nagasaki Prefecture
Japanese male triple jumpers
Asian Games competitors for Japan
Athletes (track and field) at the 2014 Asian Games
Universiade medalists in athletics (track and field)
Universiade bronze medalists for Japan
Medalists at the 2017 Summer Universiade
World Athletics Championships athletes for Japan
Japan Championships in Athletics winners